Skytteholms IP is a football stadium in Solna, Stockholm, Sweden and the home stadium for the football team Vasalunds IF. Skytteholms IP was opened in 1967, renovated in 1990 and 2003 and has a total capacity of 5,200 spectators.

References 

Vasalunds IF
Football venues in Sweden
Football venues in Stockholm
Sports venues completed in 1967
1967 establishments in Sweden